The Minneapolis-St. Paul Stock Exchange was a regional stock exchange based in Minnesota, United States. It opened for business in 1929, and merged with the Chicago Stock Exchange in 1949.

History
The new Minneapolis-St. Paul Stock Exchange opened for business in January 1929 for securities.

A new president was elected to head the Minneapolis Exchange in January 1939. Donald H. Brown, then  secretary of the Wells-Dickey Company, took the position.

In one day in the middle of April 1942, the  Minneapolis-St. Paul Stock Exchange, then exempted from registration with the SEC, did  $121,935 of stock business, "bigger than six of the registered Exchanges."

The Midwest Stock Exchange was formed in 1949, with the merger of the Minneapolis/St. Paul exchange and the Chicago Stock Exchange, the Cleveland Stock Exchange, and the St. Louis Stock Exchange.

See also
Regional stock exchange
List of former stock exchanges in the Americas
List of stock exchange mergers in the Americas
History of Minneapolis

References

Former stock exchanges in the United States
Defunct companies based in Minnesota